Metropolitan Properties Co (FCG) Ltd v Lannon was a United Kingdom constitutional law case concerning natural justice.

Facts
The case concerned a rent assessment committee that suggested a lower rate of rent than what had been suggested by an expert, and even lower than the residents had expected. The landlords appealed against this decision under section 9 of the Tribunals and Inquiries Act 1958, on the basis that a member of the committee, Mr Lannon, was biased. They argued that Mr Lannon made the decision to assist his father, who was negotiating his rent with one of the appellant landlords. On this basis, they believed the decision ought to be quashed.

Judgement
The court could not actually find any evidence that Mr Lannon himself was biased but Lord Denning emphasised that what is important is that there is no appearance of bias, stating:

On this basis, the court ruled that Mr Lannon should not have taken his role on the committee, and quashed the decision.

See also
Dimes v Grand Junction Canal
Natural justice
R v Bow Street Metropolitan Stipendiary Magistrate, ex parte Pinochet

References

1968 in case law
1968 in British law
United Kingdom administrative case law
United Kingdom constitutional case law